Anthony Dawson better known as TooTurntTony (born Feb 1, 1995), is an American social media personality, model, and wildlife conservation advocate. He is known for creating viral comedy skits, social experiments, and other videos often involving his family and domestic ducks.

Anthony began his career as a duck-rancher, where he would make role-playing videos with ducks in efforts to increase awareness of wetland conservation.

Later, Anthony began incorporating various family members such as his mother, father, and sister  (later collectively dubbed the “TooTurntFamily”) into social experiments and other comedic content.

Anthony's content channels have amassed over 21 million followers across platforms, with the additional TooTurntFamily members collectively gaining an additional 8 million.

Anthony's skits and other content have appeared on media outlets such as Univision, Business Insider,  and USA Today.

Other ventures

Too Turnt Tea 
In March 2023, TooTurntTony, in collaboration with Boston based NOCA Beverages, released a boozy iced tea known as " Too Turnt Tea". Available in March 2023, the item will be sold across the USA at a price point of $16-19 depending on the retailer. The hard seltzer is 5% and 100 calories, available in a lemon 12 pack.

References 

American TikTokers
Living people
1995 births
American YouTubers
People from Commerce, Michigan
Western Michigan University alumni